Soane Vikena (born 1 July 2001 in New Zealand) is a New Zealand rugby union player who plays for the  in Super Rugby. His playing position is hooker. He was named in the Blues squad for the 2021 Super Rugby Aotearoa season. He was also a member of the  2020 Mitre 10 Cup squad.

Reference list

External links
itsrugby.co.uk profile

2001 births
New Zealand rugby union players
Living people
Rugby union hookers
New Zealand people of Fijian descent
Auckland rugby union players
Blues (Super Rugby) players